The 1994 Copper Bowl featured the BYU Cougars, and the Oklahoma Sooners.

BYU quarterback John Walsh threw a 7-yard touchdown pass to Bryce Doman as the BYU Cougars led 7–0 after the 1st quarter. In the second quarter, David Lauder hit a 22-yard field goal bringing the lead to 10–0. Walsh threw a 25-yard touchdown pass to Mike Johnston to give BYU a 17–0 lead at halftime.

In the third quarter, Walsh and Johnston connected for the second time on a 4-yard scoring pass giving the Cougars a 24–0 lead. Oklahoma scored its only points of the game on a 2-yard Moore touchdown run making it 24–6. Walsh's 28-yard touchdown pass to Doman made the final score BYU 31, Oklahoma 6.

In total, Walsh completed 31 of 45 passes for 454 yards and four touchdowns.

References

Copper Bowl
Guaranteed Rate Bowl
BYU Cougars football bowl games
Oklahoma Sooners football bowl games
December 1994 sports events in the United States
Copper Bowl
Sports in Tucson, Arizona
Events in Tucson, Arizona